Ovu is a town in central Nigeria in Delta State.

A railway line to the port of Warri stopped short at Ovu due to a dispute with the contractor building it.  In 2009, agreement was reached to complete the 50 km line.
Ovu is in Ethiope East Local Government of Delta State, Part of Old Eastern Region now South-South Nigeria.

See also
 Railway stations in Nigeria

References

Populated places in Delta State